Metallurgical & Engineering Consultant Ltd Sail Stadium or MECON Sail Stadium is a multi purpose stadium in Ranchi, Jharkhand. The ground is mainly used for organizing matches of football, cricket and other sports.  The stadium has hosted 18 first-class matches  in 1984 when Bihar cricket team played against Orissa cricket team. The ground hosted 17 more first-class matches from 1986 to 2009. The stadium also hosted a List A matches when Bihar cricket team played against Bengal cricket team but since then the stadium has hosted non-first-class matches.

The stadium is owned and operated by MECON.

References

External links 
 cricketarchive
 cricinfo

Sports venues in Jharkhand
Buildings and structures in Ranchi
Sport in Ranchi
Cricket grounds in Jharkhand
Sports venues completed in 1984
1984 establishments in Bihar
Sports venues in Ranchi
20th-century architecture in India